Scott Moore is an American screenwriter and film director.

Early life
Scott Moore was born and raised in Honolulu, Hawaii and is an alumnus of Punahou School and the University of Colorado, Boulder.

Career
Moore is one of the writers of The Hangover, one of the highest grossing R-rated comedies of all-time.  He works with longtime writing partner Jon Lucas.  They were nominated for Best Original Screenplay in 2009 by both the British Academy of Film and Television Arts (BAFTA) and the Writers Guild of America (WGA).

With Jon Lucas, Moore wrote and directed the comedy film 21 & Over, which was their directorial debut.

In October 2012, they sold to ABC a pilot for a new comedy show named Mixology, which follows five guys and five girls "trying to find love at a trendy Manhattan bar," all over the course of a single night. The show ran for 13 episodes.

In 2016 they wrote and directed Bad Moms, which became a surprise hit, grossing over $180 million dollars worldwide and winning the People's Choice Award for Best Comedy. It was successful enough to spawn a sequel, A Bad Moms Christmas, which was also financially successful.

Works

References

External links
 

Writers from Honolulu
Living people
Year of birth missing (living people)
Punahou School alumni
University of Colorado alumni
American male screenwriters
Screenwriters from Hawaii